"Hillbilly Deluxe" is a song written by Brad Crisler and Craig Wiseman, and recorded by American country music duo Brooks & Dunn.  It was released in November 2006 as the fourth and final single and title track from the duo's album Hillbilly Deluxe.  It peaked at number 16 on the U.S. Billboard Hot Country Songs chart and number 86 on the U.S. Billboard Hot 100 chart. The single was certified Gold in the U.S.

Music video
The music video was directed by Michael Salomon and premiered in late 2006. It features the duo and their band performing the song at a huge barn party at night with many guests and events, as well as a huge bonfire. The first half of the video sees two men driving a monster truck into town to pick up several guests and then come back to set up, and the second half shows the actual party.

Cover versions
Country music singer Miranda Lambert covered the song from The Last Rodeo Tour

Chart positions
"Hillbilly Deluxe" debuted at number 57 on the U.S. Billboard Hot Country Songs for the week of November 18, 2006.

References

2006 singles
Brooks & Dunn songs
Song recordings produced by Tony Brown (record producer)
Songs written by Craig Wiseman
Arista Nashville singles
Music videos directed by Michael Salomon
2005 songs
Songs written by Brad Crisler